Roque is an American variant of croquet played on a hard smooth surface.

Roque may also refer to:

 Roque (given name), a given name (including a list of people with the name)
 Roque (surname), a surname (including a list of people with the name)
 , a Camano-class cargo ship constructed for the U.S. Army

See also
 
 
 La Roque (disambiguation)
 San Roque (disambiguation)
 São Roque (disambiguation)
 Roques (disambiguation)
 Rok (disambiguation)
 Roc (disambiguation)
 Rock (disambiguation)
 ROQ